Grodzinski  is a chain of kosher bakeries in London, England, where it is known as "Grodz," and in Toronto.

Notable products
Grodzinski is best known for its challah, a yeast bread eaten on the Sabbath, and for its babka, a cake made from a variant of yeast dough with a sweet filling traditionally eaten on the Sabbath. Other products include bagels and cookies.

History

Early years

Around 1888, bakers Harris and Judith Grodzinski joined many members of the Jewish community in the Russian Empire by migrating westward from Voranava (once a shtetl near Lida, currently in Belarus) and establishing themselves in the East End of London. There, they hired kosher ovens and set out baking Bilkele, thereby beginning a business that would grow from a trading barrow to a full-scale bakery founded in 1888.

Harris and Judith were followed by Harris's nephew, Hyam Elyah Grodzinski, who had married Judith's sister Jessie. He had a bakery at 20 Cavell Street, then called Bedford Street, before moving to a shop in Fieldgate Street, Whitechapel, over which he lived.  Around the same time, the Fieldgate Street Great Synagogue was established next door, with the bakery's basement ovens extending beneath the synagogue.

The two families swapped premises (including accommodation above) for a number of years until the Fieldgate Street bakery significantly improved. Later, Hyam changed his name to Hyam Hyams and went into the cinema business with his sons Phil and Sid.

Domestic expansion 

The bakery was then run by Harry and Judith's son Abraham (Abie) Grodzinski, who took over management of the business at the age of 18 after his father's death at the age of 54. Abie's widow, Bertha Jeidel, who had come from Pfungstadt, Germany, took over the company when Abie died from the Spanish flu pandemic. Their oldest children, Harry and Ruby Grodzinski, took over the company in 1930.

Under Harry's and Ruby's tenure, the bakery opened a second location at 91 Dunsmure Road, Stamford Hill, to which baking was moved. A decade later, the bakery expanded to six locations. The original 31 Fieldgate Street location was destroyed by a German air raid on December 29, 1940. By the mid-1960s Grodzinski was the largest kosher bakery in Europe, preparing both fine pastries and a range of bread, and adding to their retail business, an advancing wholesale operation distributed through British retailers and department stores such as Selfridges, Marks & Spencer and Harrods.

In 2014, the bakery had multiple locations in England.

Overseas expansion 

In 1999, the first Grodzinski bakery was opened in Toronto, continuing the family baking tradition into the fourth and fifth generations. When it opened, the Edgware branch in London was managed by Tova Grodzinski, the great-great-granddaughter of the founders. 

In 2014, the bakery had two Toronto locations, one on Bathurst Street and the other in Thornhill.

See also
 List of kosher restaurants

References

External links
Official website of J. Grodzinski and Daughters (London - Edgware, Stamford Hill)
Official website of M & D Grodzinski (London - Golders Green, Hendon)
Official website of Grodzinski Bakery (Toronto)
75 years of baking, from somethingjewish.co.uk 
The Grodzinsky/Grodzenchik Family from Lida, Belarus c.1785.

Bakeries of the United Kingdom
Kosher bakeries
Milchig restaurants
Restaurants in London
Restaurants in Toronto